Sérigne M'Baye Gueye (born 28 March 1978), better known by his stage name Disiz, (pronounced "This is", formerly Disiz la Peste and Disiz Peter Punk), is a French rapper and actor. Born to a Senegalese father and Belgian mother, he grew up listening to hip hop.

He was a great fan of the French rap groups NTM and IAM. He was discovered by JoeyStarr, one of the members of the famous rap group NTM after listening to a sample tape named "Bête de bombe".

Disiz has gained interest from the UK after his appearance on Channel 4's campaign: "Try life in another language". He is a follower of Islam and described his religion as his "greatest wealth" ("L'Islam est ma plus grande richesse").

Discography

Albums

Singles

Acting career

Actor 
 "Petits meurtres en famille" .... Éloi (4 episodes, 2006)
... aka A Family Murder Party (International: English title)

 Dans tes rêves (2005) (as Sérigne M'Baye) .... Ixe
... aka In Your Dreams (Australia: TV title)

Chepor, La (2004) (as Sérigne Gueye) .... Franck

TV appearances
"Salut les Terriens" (1 episode, 2006)
Noirs (2006) (TV)
"Tout le monde en parle" (3 episodes, 2005)
Live 8 (2005) (TV)
Chanson de l'année, La (2005) (TV)
Tout le monde ELA (2005) (TV)
"Taratata"  (2 episodes, 2005)
Podium (2005) (TV)
"Matinale, La" (1 episode, 2005)
"Comme au cinéma" .... Himself (1 episode, 2005)
... aka Comme au cinéma: l'émission (France: long new title)
"20h10 pétantes" .... Himself (1 episode, 2005)

Radio Show
"Planète Rap" on Skyrock (1 week, 2006)
"Planète Rap" on Skyrock (1 week, 2009)
"Planète Rap" on Skyrock (2 weeks, 2012)
"Planète Rap" on Skyrock (1 week, 2013)
"Planète Rap" on Skyrock (1 week, 2014)

External links
 http://www.channel4.com/entertainment/t4/advertorial/try-life-in-another-language/hiphop.html
 https://www.imdb.com/name/nm1305070/
 http://www.disiz.fr

References

1978 births
Living people
French rappers
French people of Senegalese descent
French Muslims
French people of Belgian descent